Jorge Velásquez (born December 28, 1946 in Chepo, Panama) is a thoroughbred horse racing Hall of Fame jockey.

Jorge Velasquez's career in thoroughbred racing began in his native Panama but as a teenager moved to the United States. In 1967 he won more races than any other American jockey and in 1969 was tops in money-winning.

In 1978 he became nationally famous for being one of the jockeys involved in probably the greatest rivalry in racing history. He finished second aboard Alydar to Affirmed in all three of the 1978 American Triple Crown races, losing by a combined total of less than two lengths. Velasquez and Alydar later achieved a small measure of satisfaction when they beat Affirmed in the 1978 Travers Stakes (although the win came via the disqualification of Affirmed for interference entering the far turn). In 1981 he rode Pleasant Colony to victory in the Kentucky Derby and Preakness Stakes but missed winning the Triple Crown when they finished third to Summing in the Belmont Stakes.

Velasquez won the 1985 Breeders' Cup Juvenile Fillies and the Breeders' Cup Classic. In 1986, he was voted the George Woolf Memorial Jockey Award by his peers and in 1990 was inducted in the National Museum of Racing and Hall of Fame. He retired as a jockey in 1997 having won 6,795 races. He worked as an official in racing and eventually became an agent for other jockeys.

References
 Jorge Velasquez at the United States' National Museum of Racing and Hall of Fame

1946 births
Living people
American jockeys
American Champion jockeys
Panamanian jockeys
United States Thoroughbred Racing Hall of Fame inductees
Panamanian emigrants to the United States
People from Chepo District